Anniversary is a 2015 Hong Kong romance film directed by Patrick Kong. It was released in Hong Kong on 31 December 2015. It is also the tenth year of Alex Fong and Stephy Tang's relationship. While they have filmed Marriage With A Fool, Love Is Not All Around and L for Love, L for Lies together, all four movies have separate storylines, but they both were starred as leading actor and actress, and directed by Patrick Kong.

Plot
The story follows the 10th anniversary of Bo (Stephy Tang) and Keung (Alex Fong). In the ten years, the couple has gone through quite a number of ups and downs. After trying to develop his career in the mainland, Keung has returned to work in Hong Kong while Bo has stayed in Hong Kong to run a wedding consultancy firm. Bo firmly believes that love is forever and has witnessed over the years numerous sweet stories of love bearing fruits. However, in private, the love between her and Keung has long turned bland. Keung wants to have children but Bo cannot care less. Once again, the couple is plunged into emotional ebb. Meanwhile, the betrayals years back begin to emerge again...

Cast
Alex Fong
Stephy Tang
Loletta Lee
David Siu
Joy Sheng
Jacky Cai
Jun Kung
Louis Cheung
Leila Tong
Jonathan Wong

Reception
The film has grossed  in mainland China.

References

Hong Kong romance films
2015 romance films
Films directed by Patrick Kong
2010s Hong Kong films